Martians Stay Home is an album by American jazz trumpeter, composer and arranger Shorty Rogers, featuring previously unreleased recordings from the 1955 sessions which produced The Swinging Mr. Rogers and Martians Come Back!, and first released on the Atlantic label in 1980.

Reception

Michael G. Nastos on Allmusic wrote: "These are nice groups with Rogers's sensitive trumpet leading in a non-threatening, mainstream groove."

Track listing 
All compositions by Shorty Rogers except where noted.
 "Loaded" (Bernie Miller) - 6:40	
 "Martians Stay Home" - 6:33
 "The Lady in Red" (Allie Wrubel, Mort Dixon) - 6:01
 "Amber Leaves" - 4:13
 "Bill" - 3:04
 "Barbaro" - 4:35
 "Peals" - 5:09
 "12th Street Rag" (Euday L. Bowman, Andy Razaf) - 4:46	
 "Easy" - 4:24
Recorded at Capitol Studios in Hollywood, CA on March 1, 1955 (tracks 1, 3, 5 & 8), October 21, 1955 (track 6) and November 3, 1955 (tracks 2, 4, 7 & 9)

Personnel 
Shorty Rogers - trumpet, flugelhorn
Jimmy Giuffre - clarinet, tenor saxophone, baritone saxophone
Pete Jolly (tracks 1, 3, 5 & 8), Lou Levy (tracks 2, 4, 6, 7 & 9) - piano
Curtis Counce (tracks 1, 3, 5 & 8), Ralph Pena (tracks 2, 4, 6, 7 & 9) - bass 
Shelly Manne - drums

References 

Shorty Rogers albums
1980 albums
Atlantic Records albums
Albums produced by Nesuhi Ertegun